Bybrua is a village in Gjøvik Municipality in Innlandet county, Norway.

Bybrua is primarily a residential area that has become a suburb of the town of Gjøvik. There is a local school, grocery store with postal functions, and a daycare centre. The village area grew up around the main county highway leading west from the town.

References

Gjøvik
Villages in Innlandet